Nazim-e-Peshawar is the Mayor who heads the Municipal Corporation of Peshawar (MCP) which controls the City District Government of Peshawar.

Khyber Pakhtunkhwa Local Government Act 2013 
Under the KPK Local government Act 2013, the City District Government of Peshawar by the District Council is formed which is divided into four towns each headed by its own Town Nazim and Naib Nazim.

following is the number of Peshawar district council members

List of mayors of Peshawar

Mayor elections history

Mayor elections 2015

Mayor election 2021 
Local bodies election were held on 19 December 2021 after the implementation of new local body structure in Khyber Pakhtunkhwa.

See also 
 Khyber Pakhtunkhwa Local Government Act 2013
 Union Councils of District Peshawar

References 

Peshawar
Mayors, Peshawar
Peshawar
Mayors of Peshawar